The Gilliam and Bisbee Building is an historic commercial structure in Heppner in the U.S. state of Oregon.

Description and history 
Built in 1919 for the Gilliam and Bisbee Hardware Company to replace a building destroyed by fire in  1918, it was added to the National Register of Historic Places in 1990.

The two-story rectangular building measures , and it has a full basement. The foundation and walls are made of concrete. The front facade is of tan-colored brick paired with darker brown brick above the storefront, its window pairs, and its decorative horizontal corbel courses. Strong vertical elements include pilasters that extend above the roof line and are topped with imitation chimney caps.

Originally, the first floor contained retail space, a stock room, a business office, a plumbing shop, a freight elevator (which served both floors and the basement), stairways, and perhaps a leased office. An open display space for farm implements occupied the second floor, also the likely site of a restroom.

Members of the Gilliam and Bisbee families, arriving in the 1860s, were among the earliest settlers in the region. Two members of the second generation, Timothy Bisbee and Frank Gilliam, both involved in stock raising, became brothers-in-law in 1882 and by 1889 were in business together as the Gilliam and Bisbee Hardware Company. Subsequent generations of both families worked in the store through the late 1950s.

In 2019, the Howard and Beth Bryant Foundation restored and renovated the Gilliam & Bisbee Building into an event center, apartment-like suites, and a conference room. This project, now owned and operated by the Heppner Community Foundation, is a gathering place for the community and private events. The 7,000-square-foot second floor contains four brand new suites each with personal 1.5 baths and a coffee bar. There is an adjacent large common area with a kitchen, lounging area, and giant gathering table, making it the perfect place for families to spend time together, or for small parties. The 4,000-square-foot first floor includes a large event center with an occupancy of 350 guests. Additionally, there is an adjacent lobby area and industrial kitchen. The event stage includes a state-of-the-art sound system for live music or a DJ, and a projector and screen for event presentations.

See also
 National Register of Historic Places listings in Morrow County, Oregon

References

1919 establishments in Oregon
Buildings and structures in Morrow County, Oregon
Commercial buildings completed in 1919
Commercial buildings on the National Register of Historic Places in Oregon
Heppner, Oregon
National Register of Historic Places in Morrow County, Oregon